Ravi Dubey (born 23 December 1983)  is an Indian actor, model, television presenter and producer. 
He began his acting career in 2006 with a parallel lead role in the show Stree Teri Kahaani and followed it with roles in less successful shows like Doli Saja Ke (2007) and Yahan Ke Hum Sikandar (2007), before starring in the popular family drama shows Saas Bina Sasural (2010) and Jamai Raja (2014), which established him as one of the most popular and leading actors of Indian Television industry. He also participated in the reality shows Nach Baliye 5 (2012) and Fear Factor: Khatron Ke Khiladi 8 (2017).

Early life 

Dubey was born in Gorakhpur, Uttar Pradesh and was brought up in Delhi, India. His father, Sh. Gyan Prakash Dubey, is a Civil Engineer by qualification, and has worked in top management with many real estate organisations in the Delhi/NCR Region.

Dubey came to Mumbai from Delhi to study telecom engineering, but then he started his modelling career.

Career

Debut show (2006-09)

Dubey started his career as a model, then he started his acting career in 2006 with the parallel lead role of Ravi Agarwal in the DD National television show Stree... Teri Kahaani, which was produced by actors Dilip Kumar and Saira Banu. Later he portrayed the small role of "Veer" in Sahara One's soap opera Doli Saja Ke. Thereafter, he appeared as the male lead in Yahan Ke Hum Sikandar, where he played the role of Ravi.

Dubey has done up to 40 television commercial ads, including Reliance, TVS Victor, Mrs. Marino, Gee Pee Mobile, Nestle, ICICI, Action Milano Shoes, Fairever, Santro and Water Kingdom.

In December 2008, Dubey replaced Vinay Rohrra for portraying the male lead in Zee television's show Ranbir Rano. After the show ended, Dubey was cast opposite Sargun Mehta in Zee television's soap opera 12/24 Karol Bagh.

Breakthrough and success (2010–14)
In October 2010, Dubey featured opposite Aishwarya Sakhuja for Sony Entertainment Television's romantic/drama show Saas Bina Sasural, in which he portrayed the male lead role of Tej Prakash Chaturvedi. While working in the show, Dubey started his film career in Bollywood; he signed for Aron Govil's 2011 Hindi film U R My Jaan.

In January 2012, Dubey participated in Sony Entertainment Television's reality-based comedy series of Comedy Circus titled, Kahani Comedy Circus Ki. Dubey said, "I am super excited as I have always loved the show. So far I have never had the opportunity to try my hands at comedy, which I believe is the toughest of all".

In December 2012, Dubey participated in the fifth season of Star Plus television's celebrity couple dance reality show Nach Baliye, along with Sargun Mehta. And on 23 March 2013, in the finale episode, He became the first runner-up of the show. Dubey also participated in another of Nach Baliye's celebrity couple dance reality series titled, Nach Baliye Shriman v/s Shrimati in 2013.

In May 2013, Dubey started hosting television shows, He replaced Mohit Malhotra to host Star Plus television's dance reality show India's Dancing Superstar.

In September 2013, he was approached for the lead role of Rajbir in Rashmi Sharma's show Desh Ki Beti Nandini, but he was out of the show. Dubey has also appeared along with Shweta Salve at Indian Television Academy's ramp show Fashion Ka Jalwa.

Jamai Raja and further success (2014–present)
In March 2014, Dubey got the male lead in Zee television's soap opera Jamai Raja, in which he plays the role of Siddharth "Sid" Khurana opposite Nia Sharma, the show produced by incredible actor Akshay Kumar and co-produced by Ashvini Yardi, under their own production banner, Grazing Goat Pictures.

In December 2014, Dubey hosted an award event of Zee televisions', Zee Rishtey Awards, along with Shabbir Ahluwalia.

In 2017, Dubey participated in Colors stunt reality show Fear Factor: Khatron Ke Khiladi 8 in its eighth season where he ended up being the 2nd Runner-up whilst Shantanu Maheshwari was the winner and Hina Khan was the 1st Runner-up.

In November 2017, Dubey was seen as one of the contestants in the Colors comedy show Entertainment Ki Raat along with Dipika Kakar and Asha Negi. He also participated in Star Plus reality show Lip Sing Battle along with wife Sargun Mehta, Rithvik Dhanjani & Asha Negi.

In January 2018, Ravi hosted the Colors singing reality show Rising Star. In June 2018, he also hosted the Star Plus game show Sabse Smart Kaun. As of February 2019, Dubey hosted the Seventh Season of Sa Re Ga Ma Pa L'il Champs on Zee TV replace Aditya Narayan.

Ravi has been associated with hosting the Zee Rishtey Awards 2014, 2015, 2017, 2018 and 2019.

He made his debut into the digital space alongside Nia Sharma with the web series Jamai 2.0, which is a reboot of his Zee TV show Jamai Raja. The series opened to good reviews. The second season released in February 2021, receiving positive responses. He is currently working as a lead actor in popular web series MatsyaKaand on mxplayer which is one of the highest rated and most watched web series of India.
In 2019, he had opened his own production house Dreamiyata Entertainment Pvt Ltd, with his wife Sargun Mehta and co-produced several films. In March 2021, Dreamiyata Entertainment produced television series Udaariyaan, which airs on Colors TV.

Personal life

Dubey married actress Sargun Mehta on 7 December 2013.

Dubey a follower of nichiren daishonins Buddhism.

Filmography

Films

Television

Web series

Music videos

Discography

Awards

References

External links 

 
 
 

Living people
1983 births
People from Gorakhpur
Male actors in Hindi cinema
Indian male television actors
Indian television presenters
21st-century Indian male actors
Indian Buddhists
Nichiren Buddhists
Participants in Indian reality television series
Fear Factor: Khatron Ke Khiladi participants